The 2019 Balkan Athletics Championships was the 74th edition of the annual track and field competition for athletes from the Balkans, organised by Balkan Athletics. It was held at the Pravets Sports Complex in Pravets, Bulgaria on 2 and 3 September. It was the first time that the city hosted the competition.

Three championship records were broken: both 200 metres records were improved (the men's by Ukraine's Serhiy Smelyk in 20.50 seconds, and the women's by Bulgarian Ivet Lalova-Collio, who ran 22.45 seconds), while Greek men's pole vaulter Emmanouil Karalis cleared a record height of 5.66 m. Lalova-Collio won a sprint double in the women's 100 metres and 200 m while Smelyk won golds for Ukraine in the 200 m and 4 × 100 metres relay. Ukraine was the most successful nation at the competition, topping the medal table with 18 medals (nine of them gold). Romania also won 18 medals, though only five golds. Greece, Turkey and host nation Bulgaria all won five or more gold medals.

Romanian men's throwers Andrei Gag and Alin Alexandru Firfirică successfully defended their titles. In women's jumps Mirela Demireva (high jump), Buse Arıkazan (pole vault) and Paraskevi Papachristou (triple jump) all repeated their victories from 2018. Serbia's Teodora Simović (5000 m) was the sole individual to retain a track title while her compatriot Marija Vučenović took her third straight javelin throw title.

Results

Men

Women

Medal table

References

Results
Balkan Senior Championships Pravets BUL. Balkan Athletics. Retrieved 2019-11-16.

2019
Sport in Sofia Province
International athletics competitions hosted by Bulgaria
Balkan Athletics Championships
Balkan Athletics Championships
Balkan Athletics Championships